The 2021 Associate international cricket season was from May to September 2021. All official twenty over matches between Associate members of the ICC were eligible to have full Twenty20 International (T20I) or Women's Twenty20 International (WT20I) status, as the International Cricket Council (ICC) granted T20I status to matches between all of its members from 1 July 2018 (women's teams) and 1 January 2019 (men's teams). The season included all T20I/WT20I cricket series mostly involving ICC Associate members, that were played in addition to series covered in International cricket in 2021. In July 2021, Mongolia and Tajikistan were awarded Associate Membership of the ICC, and Switzerland were also readmitted as associate members.

Season overview

May

2021 Central Europe Cup

June

2021 Kwibuka Women's T20 Tournament

2021 Sofia Twenty20 Series

2021 ICC T20 World Cup Europe Qualifier B

The tournament was cancelled due to COVID-19 pandemic.

July

2021 ICC T20 World Cup Europe Qualifier C

The tournament was cancelled due to COVID-19 pandemic.

2021 ICC T20 World Cup Europe Qualifier A

The tournament was cancelled due to COVID-19 pandemic.

Belgium in Malta

France women in Germany

Guernsey women in Jersey

The series was postponed due to the COVID-19 pandemic.

Austria in Belgium

2021 ICC T20 World Cup Americas Qualifier

The tournament was postponed due to COVID-19 pandemic.

August

2021 Germany Tri-Nation Series

Austria women in Italy

2021 Baltic Cup
Matches played at the Baltic Cup did not have T20I status as only Estonia were members of the ICC.

Sweden in Denmark

Ghana in Rwanda

2021 Portugal Tri-Nation Series

Sweden in Finland

2021 ICC Women's T20 World Cup Europe Qualifier

 advances to global qualifier

Norway women in Sweden

September

2021 Continental Cup

Germany in Spain

See also
 International cricket in 2021
 Impact of the COVID-19 pandemic on cricket

Notes

References

2021 in cricket